Antoigny is a former commune in the Orne department in northwestern France. On 12 January 2016, Antoigny was annexed by the commune of La Ferté-Macé.

Population
The inhabitants are known as Antoniaciens.

See also
Communes of the Orne department
Parc naturel régional Normandie-Maine

References

Former communes of Orne